Doug Wrenn (born January 21, 1980) is an American basketball player who played forward for the University of Connecticut and the University of Washington.  He was named Washington High School Player of the Year in 1998.

Career
Wrenn led O'Dea High School to a state championship as a junior and was named Parade Magazine prep All-American as a senior. He was a former Washington player of the year.He was convicted of assault in 2009. He was ranked by Complex as the 19th best player that never made it to the NBA.

Professional career
Wrenn signed with Úrvalsdeild karla club Njarðvík in March 2005, along with Alvin Snow, replacing Americans Anthony Lackey and Matt Sayman. He appeared in two playoff games for Njarðvík against ÍR, averaging 14.5 points and 5.5 rebounds in the 0-2 series loss.

Personal life
In 2021, Wrenn graduated with honors with a sociology degree from the University of Washington.

References

External links
Profile at Eurobasket.com
Profile at Proballers.com

Living people
1980 births
American expatriate basketball people in Iceland
American men's basketball players
UConn Huskies men's basketball players
Place of birth missing (living people)
Washington Huskies men's basketball players
Njarðvík men's basketball players
Úrvalsdeild karla (basketball) players